Margot Davy is a French model and businesswoman. She has been photographed for publications such as Vogue and Harper’s Bazaar. She has also modeled for brands such as Giorgio Armani, Dolce & Gabbana, Cartier and Air France. Margot is also the founder of travel company Offset Guide.

Early life 
Margot grew up in Burgundy, France. She was scouted in 2017 while working in the field of artistic direction in Paris.

Career 
One of Margot’s first major jobs was appearing for Paco Rabanne at Fashion Week 2017. She also appeared in campaigns for designers such as Giorgio Armani and Malene Birger in 2017.
In 2018, Margot was photographed for Marie Claire Russia, IO Donna, iMute Magazine, and Vogue Poland.

Margot founded Offset Guide in 2018.

Margot also appeared in Koché’s show at Fashion Week 2019. She also modeled for Cartier Eyewear.

In 2020, Margot was photographed for Grazia UK and the cover of Damernas Värld. She modeled for brands such as Parfois and H&M. She also appeared in an advertising campaign for Honda.

Selected Modeling Credits 

 Cartier
 Girogio Armani
 Dolce & Gabbana
 Air France
 Honda
 Damernas Värld
 Parfois
 H&M
 Grazia UK
 SCMP Style
 Elle France
 Harper’s Bazaar (Vietnam and Serbia editions)
 Vogue Taiwan
 L’Officiel

Personal life 
Margot is a practitioner of yoga.

References 

French female models
Living people
Year of birth missing (living people)